The Amherst Mammoths represent Amherst College of Amherst, Massachusetts in the sport of college football. The football team is coached by E. J. Mills.  Amherst is one of the "Little Three," along with Williams College and Wesleyan University.

History
Amherst claims its athletics program as the oldest in the nation, pointing to its compulsory physical fitness regimen put in place in 1860 (the mandate that all students participate in sports or pursue physical education has been discontinued). One-third of the student body participates in sports at the intercollegiate level, and eighty percent participate in intramural and club sports teams.

References

External links
 

 
American football teams established in 1877
1877 establishments in Massachusetts